The Königsberg class was a group of four light cruisers built for the German Imperial Navy. The ships were an improvement on the preceding Bremen class, being slightly larger and faster, and mounting the same armament of ten 10.5 cm SK L/40 guns and two  torpedo tubes.

The four ships saw extensive service during World War I. Königsberg conducted commerce warfare in the Indian Ocean before being trapped in the Rufiji River and sunk by British warships. Her guns nevertheless continued to see action as converted artillery pieces for the German Army in German East Africa. Nürnberg was part of the German East Asia Squadron, and participated in the Battles of Coronel and Falkland Islands. At the former, she sank the British armored cruiser , and at the latter, she was in turn sunk by the cruiser .

Stuttgart and Stettin remained in German waters during the war, and both saw action at the Battle of Jutland on 31 May and 1 June 1916. The two cruisers engaged in close-range night fighting with the British fleet, but neither was significantly damaged. Both ships were withdrawn from service later in the war, Stettin to serve as a training ship, and Stuttgart to be converted into a seaplane tender in 1918. They both survived the war, and were surrendered to Britain as war prizes; they were dismantled in the early 1920s.

Design
The Königsberg design followed the same general parameters as the two earlier classes, but with significant improvements in terms of size and speed. Like the Bremens, one member of the Königsberg class, was fitted with steam turbines to evaluate their performance compared to traditional triple-expansion engines. Compared to the Bremens, the Königsbergs included an additional boiler to increase the top speed.

The need for enhanced protection against underwater weapons like naval mines had been aptly demonstrated in these early engagements, and so the German design staff made alterations to the Königsberg design. The designers added an additional watertight bulkhead to both of the aft boiler rooms, increasing the number of watertight compartments from thirteen to fifteen, thereby reducing the risk of flooding disabling multiple boilers. This change necessitated a rearranging of the coal storage bunkers, so the three 1905 cruisers had to be lengthened by  compared to the lead ship.

General characteristics

The ships of the Königsberg class had slightly different characteristics.

The ships' hulls were constructed with transverse and longitudinal steel frames, over which the steel outer hull was built. The hulls were divided into thirteen or fourteen watertight compartments. A double bottom ran for forty-seven percent of the length of the keel. Steering was controlled by a single rudder. The ships of the class were good sea boats, but they were crank and rolled up to twenty degrees. They were also very wet at high speeds and suffered from a slight weather helm; in the case of Stuttgart, she suffered from quite severe weather helm. The ships had a crew of fourteen officers and 308 enlisted men. They carried a number of smaller boats, including one picket boat, one barge, one cutter, two yawls, and two dinghies.

Machinery

Each ship exceeded their design speed by at least half a knot on speed trials, however. All four ships' engines were powered by eleven coal-fired Marine-type boilers, which were trunked into three funnels. Königsberg had two electricity generators, while the other three ships were equipped with three generators. The generators produced a total output of 90 and 135 kilowatts at 100 volts, respectively.

Armament and armor
The ships were armed with ten 10.5 cm SK L/40 guns in single pedestal mounts. Two were placed side by side forward on the forecastle, six were located amidships, three on either side, and two were side by side aft. They were supplied with 1,500 rounds of ammunition, for 150 shells per gun. Königsberg later had a pair of  guns installed. The last three ships were also equipped with eight 5.2 cm SK L/55 guns with 4,000 rounds of ammunition. All four ships were also equipped with a pair of  torpedo tubes with five torpedoes submerged in the hull on the broadside.

Armor protection for the members of the class consisted of two layers of steel with one layer of Krupp armor.

Construction
The first three ships of the class were built by government shipyards. Königsberg was laid down at the Imperial Dockyard in Kiel in 1905, launched on 12 December 1905, and commissioned into the German Navy on 6 April 1907. Nürnberg was also laid down at the Imperial Dockyard in Kiel, in 1906. Her launching occurred on 28 August 1906, and she was commissioned on 10 April 1908. Stuttgart was built by the Imperial Dockyard in Danzig. She was laid down in 1905, launched on 22 September 1906, and commissioned on 1 February 1908. Stettin was the only ship of the class built by a private shipbuilding firm, by AG Vulcan in her namesake city. She was laid down in 1906, launched on 7 March 1907, and commissioned just seven months later on 29 October 1907.

Service history

The ships of the Königsberg class served with the High Seas Fleet after their commissionings, though Stuttgart also saw service as a gunnery training ship. Nürnberg and Königsberg were deployed overseas in 1910 and 1914, respectively. Nürnberg was sent to the East Asia Squadron, while Königsberg went to east African waters. Stuttgart and Stettin meanwhile remained in Germany.

All four ships had active careers during World War I and saw action at many major battles during the conflict. At the outbreak of war, Königsberg was stationed in German East Africa; she was ordered to begin raiding British commerce in the region. She was relatively unsuccessful in this regard, having sunk only the British freighter City of Winchester. She did, however, surprise the British cruiser  in harbor and sank her in the Battle of Zanzibar. Königsbergs guns were removed from the wreck and mounted on improvised gun carriages and used in German East Africa during the World War I land campaign.

Nürnberg was still assigned to the East Asia Squadron under Admiral Maximilian von Spee when war broke out. Initially based in Tsingtao, China, the squadron crossed the Pacific in an attempt to raid British commerce off South America. The ship saw action at the Battle of Coronel in November 1914 where a British squadron attempted to intercept the German flotilla. There she sank the British armored cruiser . The following month during the Battle of the Falkland Islands, Nürnberg was sunk by the armored cruiser , part of another British squadron sent to hunt down Spee's squadron.

Stettin and Stuttgart both saw action with the High Seas Fleet in the North Sea. Stettin participated in the Battle of Heligoland Bight in August 1914, and suffered relatively minor damage. Both cruisers participated in the Battle of Jutland on 31 May and 1 June 1916. Stettin was hit twice but was not badly damaged during the night, while Stuttgart emerged from the battle unscathed. Both ships were withdrawn from service in 1917; Stettin was used as a training ship, while Stuttgart was converted into a seaplane tender in 1918. The two ships survived the war and were surrendered to Britain as war prizes; they were later broken up for scrap in the early 1920s.

Notes

Footnotes

Citations

References

Further reading
 
 
 

Cruiser classes
 
World War I cruisers of Germany